Jack Finegan (July 11, 1908 – July 15, 2000) was an American biblical scholar and Professor of New Testament History and Archaeology at the Pacific School of Religion in Berkeley, California. While a professor at Iowa State University in Ames, Iowa, he published Light from the Ancient Past in 1946. He was notable for his views on biblical chronology.

Works
 Light from the Ancient Past-The Archaeological Background of the Hebrew-Christian Religion, J. Finegan, 1946, 2nd ed. 1959
 Chronology of the New Testament, W. Armstrong and J. Finegan, ISBE
 Handbook of Biblical Chronology: Principles of Time Reckoning in the Ancient World and Problems of Chronology in the Bible, 1964, 2nd ed. 1998
 Encountering New Testament Manuscripts: A Working Introduction to Textual Criticism
 Hidden Records of the Life of Jesus
 Discovering Israel Archaeological Guide to the Holy Land
 The Archaeology of the New Testament: The Mediterranean of the Early Christian Apostles, 1981

References

1908 births
2000 deaths
American biblical scholars